Kırgın Çiçekler is a Turkish drama/psychological thriller television series that premiered in 29 June 2015. It stars İpek Karapınar, Özgür Çevik, Biran Damla Yılmaz, Gökçe Akyıldız, Hazar Motan, Çağla Irmak and Aleyna Solaker.

The first episode was published on 29 June 2015. On 12 January 2016, Dizi won the Best Drama Award for the Barrier-free Life Foundation.

It also received the best series award at the award ceremony organized by Istanbul Gelişim University. There are nominations for award ceremonies in Korea and France.

Plot 
Eylül is a 16-years-old, young girl. She lost her father when she was 11. She lives in a small shanty with her mother Mesude, sister Büşra and her stepfather Kemal. Eylül is harassed by Kemal. She tells her mother. Her mother did not believe Eylül and gave her away to the orphanage. Orphanage days start from that day for Eylül. There is no connection between Eylül and the 4 girls in the room where Eylül stays. Eylül forms a strong sisterly bond with the other four orphans and the show revolves around the 5 girls, Eylül, Songul, Kader, Cemre and Meral. It focuses on the struggles and hardships they face from the society due to them being orphans and their longing for parents. But their friendship and sisterhood is what makes their relationship stronger and that they can overcome anything together.

The orphans live at an orphanage in an elite area of Istanbul and thus, all five orphans attend a private school alongside elite teenagers of Istanbul. Strong tensions are present between the orphans and elite students at the school but love, crime, and drama force an interconnectedness among the teens.

Cast and characters

Main characters

Supporting characters

International broadcasting

References

External links

Turkish drama television series
ATV (Turkey) original programming
2015 Turkish television series debuts
2018 Turkish television series endings